María-Victoria Baldovinos-Cibeira (born 8 February 1953) is a Spanish former professional tennis player.

Baldovinos, a native of Barcelona, was ranked as high as number two in Spain. She reached the round of 16 at the 1974 French Open and appeared in a total of 16 ties for the Spain Federation Cup team.

See also
List of Spain Fed Cup team representatives

References

External links

 
 
 

1953 births
Living people
Spanish female tennis players
Tennis players from Barcelona
Sportswomen from Catalonia